LaDonna Smith (born 1951) is an American avant garde musician from Alabama. She is a violinist, violist, and pianist. Since 1974 she has been performing free improvisational music with musicians such as Davey Williams, Leland Davis, Michael Evans, Gunther Christmann, Anne Lebaron, Derek Bailey, Eugene Chadbourne, Misha Feigin, Michael Evans, David Sait, Jack Wright, John Russell, Sergey Letov, Toshi Makihara, Andrew Dewar and many other of the world's major improvisers. As a performer, she has toured the US, Canada, Europe, including Russia and Siberia, Korea, India, China and Japan. Her music is documented on dozens of CD and LP recordings, including Say Daybew Records - of Fred Lane & the Debonaires. She produced concerts and festivals in Alabama and the Southeast, including the Birmingham Improv Festival and the improvisor festival.  She serves on the Board of Directors of I.S.I.M., the International Society of Improvised Music. In 1976, LaDonna Smith co-founded TransMuseq Records with Davey Williams. In 1980, The Improvisor magazine began as an extension of I.N.: The Improvisor's Network, a grass-roots organization in New York City that attempted to connect improvising musicians across the U.S. LaDonna is editor-in-chief and publisher of The improvisor. She is a member of the Fresh-Dirt collective (Alabama Surrealism).

Discography

Raudelunas Pataphysical Revue - Ron Pate & the Debonairs, Say Day-Bew, 1975
Trans -  Davey Williams, LaDonna Smith, Theodore Bowen, Timothy Reed, Jim Hearon, Transmuseq Records, 1977
Armed Forces Day - The Blue Denim Deals With the Arms, Say Day-Bew Records, 1978
Folk Music - Davey Williams, Ted Bowen, Transmuseq Records, 1978
2000 Statues - Eugene Chadbourne, Parachute, 1978
School - John Zorn, Eugene Chadbourne, Parachute, 1978
Jewels - with Anne LeBaron, Davey Williams, 1979
Velocity - with Andrea Centazzo, Davey Williams, Transmuseq, 1979
Direct Waves - with Davey Williams, Transmuseq, 1980
USA Tour - with Andrea Centazzo, Davey Williams, Ictus, 1980
Alchemical Rowdies - with Davey Williams, Pippin Barnett, Danny Finney, Paul Watson, Transmuseq, 1982
White Earth Streak - with Davey Williams, Gunter Christmann, Transmuseq, 1983
Locales for Ecstasy - with Davey Williams, Cinnie Cole, Transmuseq, 1987
Dix Improvisations - with Davey Williams, Victoriaville (Victo), 1989, compilation
Earbook, Vol 3 - with Davey Williams, (Rastacan), 1991, compilation
Eye of the Storm - Solo Violin & viola, Transmuseq, 1992
Transmutating - with Davey Williams, Transmuseq, 1993
A Confederacy of Dances Vol 2 - Live Recordings of the Roulette Series (Einstein, 1994)
Dice (She Says) - Elise Kermani compilation (Ishtar Records), 1994
Harbinger - with Barbie Williamson, Album Cover Photography Melissa Springer, (Coyoteway Productions), 1994
Dice 2 (She Says) - Elise Kermani compilation (Ishtar Records), 1996
Birmingham Improv Festival Recordings - compilation (Transmuseq), 1996
The Parachute Years - John Zorn (Tzadik), 1997
White Earth Streak - Christman, Muller, Smith, Williams 1981-83 (Unheard Music), 2000
Rare Earth - solo, mixed-electronic viola & violin, Table of the Elements, 2004
Yokel Yen - LaDonna Smithwith Misha Feigin, guitar & balalaika, Transmuseq, 2004
Waters Ashore - LaDonna Smith, Misha Feigin, Dave Liebman, Jason Foureman (Transmuseq), 2006
Ambient Visage - LaDonna Smith with Susan Alcorn pedalsteel guitar, Transmuseq, 2006
Floating Bridges - LaDonna Smith with Misha Feigin, guitar, Transmuseq, 2008
Deviant Shakti - LaDonna Smith with Michael Evans, percussion, Transmuseq, 2009
Time Delayed Free Improvisations - LaDonna Smith, David Sait, Glen Hall, Gino Robair (aPPRISe), 2009
Postage Paid Duets - Vol. 2 - David Sait w/Glen Hall w/Gino Robair w/LaDonna Smith. Apprise AP-03, 2009, CD
The Laycock Duos - Christian Asplund,  LaDonna Smith, Stuart Dempster, Malcolm Goldstein, (Comprovise) 2009
Fresh Dirt -  LaDonna Smith, Davey Williams, Johnny Williams, Janice Hathaway (fresh-dirt.us) 2018
Sequana Sessions - Davey Williams & LaDonna Smith, (Transmuseq) 2015
Rising Tulips - LaDonna Smith, solo 5 string electric, (Transmuseq) 2019 
Channeling the Gatehouse, LaDonna Smith & Leland Davis (TransMuseq) 2020

References

External links
 "LaDonna Smith | Jazz | Viola", All About Jazz, musician bio.
Article from Village Voice
[ Biography] from Allmusic Guide
"Viola Player LaDonna Smith Kicks Off Improvised Music Festival", Seattle Post Intelligencer, April 25, 1997. Google News Mirror
"String Trek | Floating Bridges", All About Jazz, review of Floating Bridges, April 20, 2008.
"Transmuseq is Back", Signal To Noise, June 2006.
 LaDonna Smith, Wire, issue #67, 1989.
 LaDonna Homepage, at www.the-improvisor.org.
 "Raudelunas Pataphysical Revue", nubis oxis quorum, at craignutt.com.
 "Both Kinds of Music", Steve Loewy, All Music Guide, EXPERT RATING: From AMG Reviews.
 "Dix Improvisations Victoriaville" François Couture, All Music Guide, EXPERT RATING: From AMG Reviews, 1989.
 "DABLUS", from Deep Sea Divers, Novisibirsk, 1995.
 "Saturnalia Fest", Boston, 2000
 "Perfect Sound Forever", article/interview, 2003.
 "High Zero Festival", highzero.org, bio, 2005.
 "Bagatellen", review/archive, 2005.
 "LaDonna", documentary article, Sergey Letov, Moscow, Russia.
 Profile, All About Jazz, teacher profile.
 November 2005 Calendar, Sequenza21/Classical Music Weekly, 11/12/2005.
 "Ladonna Smith Eye of Storm", review of Eye of the Storm, 2009.
 Review of Deviant Shakti, Foxy Digitalis, 2009.
 "Board of Directors", International Society of Improvised Music, 2008–10.
 Untitled article, New Music Box, New Music Center, 2009.
Option Article, Solo and Discussion, Experimental Sound Studio

1951 births
Living people
Musicians from Alabama
American experimental musicians
American violinists
American violists
Women violists
American music educators
American women music educators
21st-century violinists
21st-century American women
21st-century violists